Lady Whitehouse is a settlement in Kenya's Nyanza Province.

Languages 
The predominant language in Nyanza is Dholuo, a Nilotic language whose origins are from Southern Sudan, spoken by the Luo.

Other languages include Gusii, Luhya, Kuria, Suba and the national languages English and Swahili. Other languages from the many Kenyan communities are also spoken in small pockets by migrants from these communities.

Notable residents 
Barack Obama, Sr., was born in the Nyanza Province. He is the father of the President of the United States Barack Obama, Jr. Others include the independence fighters and socialist politicians Achieng Oneko and Jaramogi Oginga Odinga, the latter's son Prime Minister Raila Odinga, former ministers Robert Ouko and Tom Mboya, and the historian Bethwell Allan Ogot.

References 

Populated places in Nyanza Province